Growing Up is a 1983 film by Taiwanese filmmaker Chen Kunhou. The screenplay was the first collaboration between Hou Hsiao-hsien and Chu T’ien-wen. The film made the young star, Doze Niu, "a pop icon and tagged him with a rebellious image."

Growing Up was the film that "first attracted broad critical and popular attention to the movement" known as New Taiwan Cinema. It "established some of the movement's key stylistic approaches and narrative concerns, with its subdued manner in relating the story of an adolescent boy grappling with everyday pangs amid Taiwan's fraught provincial context." The film was selected as the Taiwanese entry for the Best Foreign Language Film at the 56th Academy Awards, but was not accepted as a nominee.

See also
 List of submissions to the 56th Academy Awards for Best Foreign Language Film
 List of Taiwanese submissions for the Academy Award for Best Foreign Language Film

References

External links

Growing Up at the Chinese Movie Database

1983 films
1983 drama films
1980s Mandarin-language films
Central Motion Picture Corporation films
Films with screenplays by Chu T’ien-wen
Taiwanese drama films